Krishna Mohan Banerjee (24 May 1813 – 11 May 1885) was a 19th-century Indian thinker who attempted to rethink Hindu philosophy, religion and ethics in response to the stimulus of Christian ideas. He himself became a Christian, and was the first president of the Bengal Christian Association, which was administered and financed by Indians. He was a prominent member of Henry Louis Vivian Derozio's (1808–1831) Young Bengal group, educationist, linguist and Christian missionary.

Early life

Son of Jibon Krishna Banerjee and Sreemoti Devi, Krishna Mohan was born on 24 May 1813 at Shyampur, Kolkata, Bengal, in the house of his maternal grandfather, Ramjay Vidyabhusan, the court-pundit of Santiram Singha of Jorasanko.

In 1819, Krishna Mohan joined the School Society Institution (later renamed as Hare School) founded by David Hare at colootola. Impressed by his talents, Hare took him to his school at Pataldanga, later famous as Hare School in 1822.

Banerjee joined the newly founded Hindu College with a scholarship.

In 1831, the religious-reformer-and-litterateur started publishing The Inquirer. In the same year his play, The Persecuted: or, Dramatic Scenes Illustrative of the Present State of Hindoo Society in Calcutta, was produced. It was monotonically critical of certain prevalent social practices.

While at college he used to attend the lectures of the Scottish Christian missionary, Alexander Duff, who had come to India in 1830.

His father died of cholera in 1828.

Conversion to Christianity
On completion of his studies in 1829, Banerjee joined Pataldanga School as an assistant teacher. In 1832, he converted to Christianity, under the influence of Alexander Duff. As a result of his conversion, he lost his job in David Hare’s school and his wife, Bindhyobashini Banerjee, was forced to return to her own father's house, only to join him in later life. Nevertheless, he later became the headmaster of Church Missionary Society School.

When the missionary society had begun its philanthropic activities in Kolkata, Banerjee became the first Bengali priest of Christ Church where he used to preach and deliver sermons in Bengali.

He converted his wife, his brother Kali Mohan, and Ganendra Mohan Tagore, the son of Prasanna Coomar Tagore to Christian faith. Subsequently, Ganendra Mohan married his daughter Kamalmani and became the first Indian to qualify as a barrister. He was also instrumental in the conversion of Michael Madhusudan Dutt.

Later life
In 1852, Krishna Mohan was appointed a professor of Oriental Studies at Bishop's College, Kolkata. He had studied aspects of Christianity as a student of the same college between 1836 and 1839.

In 1864 he was elected to be a member of the Royal Asiatic Society along with Iswar Chandra Vidyasagar. In 1876 the University of Calcutta honoured him with an honorary doctorate degree.

Reverend Krishna Mohan Banerjee died on 11 May 1885 in Kolkata, and was buried at Shibpur with his wife. The graveyard is currently located inside the campus of IIEST.

Works

He published a 13-volume English – Bengali adaptation of Encyclopædia Britannica, Vidyakalpadruma or Encyclopædia Bengalensis (1846–51). He wrote an Indian English drama "The persecuted" in 1831..

His other works include The Arian Witness (1875), Dialogues on the Hindu Philosophy (1861), and The Relation Between Christianity and Hinduism (1881).

Memory 

A halt station named Krishna Mohan railway station in Sealdah South lines Baruipur - Lakshmikantapur route is marked in memoirs of Rev. Krishna Mohan Banerjee.

References

reverend Krishnamohan Bandyopadhyay Dwi-Shatabarsher Aloye, ed. Sanatkumar Naskar and Kasturi Mukhopadhyay, Ratnabali, 2013

External links

Further reading
 Mayukh Das, Reverend Krishnamohan Bandyopadhyaya (in Bengali), Kolkata:Paschimbanga Anchalik Itihas O Loksanskriti Charcha Kendra (2014) 
 T. V. Philip, Krishna Mohan Banerjea, Christian apologist (1982)
 Ramachandra Ghosha, A Biographical Sketch of the Rev. K. M. Banerjea ed. by Manabendra Naskar & Mayukh Das, Corpus Research Institute, Kolkata (2012)
 Durgadas Lahiri, Adarshacharit Krishnamohan ed. by Mayukh Das, Kolkata:Paschimbanga Anchalik Itihas O Loksanskriti Charcha Kendra(2012)
 K. Baago, Pioneers of Indigenous Christianity (1969)
 Ramtanu Lahiri O Tatkalin Bangasamaj in Bengali by Sivanath Sastri
 Sansad Bangali Charitabhidhan (Biographical dictionary) in Bengali edited by Subodh Chandra Sengupta and Anjali Bose
 Tattwabodhini Patrika and the Bengal Renaissance by Amiya Kumar Sen

1813 births
1885 deaths
19th-century Bengalis
Bengali writers
Young Bengal
Hare School alumni
Presidency University, Kolkata alumni
University of Calcutta alumni
Christian clergy from Kolkata
Indian Anglicans
Converts to Christianity from Hinduism
Indian Anglican missionaries
19th-century Indian scholars
Indian scholars
19th-century Indian male writers
Indian social workers
Indian social reformers
Educators from West Bengal
Indian educators
19th-century Indian educators
Educationists from India
19th-century Indian educational theorists
19th-century Indian linguists
Indian columnists
Indian male essayists
19th-century Indian essayists
Indian non-fiction writers
Indian male non-fiction writers
19th-century Indian non-fiction writers
Indian religious writers
Indian dramatists and playwrights
Indian male dramatists and playwrights
19th-century Indian dramatists and playwrights
English-language writers from India
19th-century Indian translators
Indian encyclopedists